The 2017–18 Saint Louis Billikens women's basketball team represents the Saint Louis University during the 2017–18 NCAA Division I women's basketball season. The Billikens, led by sixth year head coach Lisa Stone, play their home games at the Chaifetz Arena and were members of the Atlantic 10 Conference. They finished the season 17–16, 9–7 in A-10 play to finish in seventh place. They advanced to the semifinals of the A-10 women's tournament where they lost to Saint Joseph's. They received an at-large bid to the Women's National Invitation Tournament where they lost to Kansas State in the first round.

Media
All non-televised Billikens home games and conference road games stream on the A-10 Digital Network.

Roster

Schedule

|-
!colspan=9 style="background:#; color:#FFFFFF;"| Exhibition

|-
!colspan=9 style="background:#; color:#FFFFFF;"| Non-conference regular season

|-
!colspan=9 style="background:#; color:#FFFFFF;"| Atlantic 10 regular season

|-
!colspan=9 style="background:#;"| Atlantic 10 Tournament

|-
!colspan=9 style="background:#;"| WNIT

Rankings
2017–18 NCAA Division I women's basketball rankings

See also
 2017–18 Saint Louis Billikens men's basketball team

References

Saint Louis
Saint Louis Billikens women's basketball seasons
Saint Louis